Santiago Polanco-Abreu (October 30, 1920 – January 18, 1988) was the 10th Resident Commissioner of Puerto Rico.

Biography 
Born in Bayamón, Puerto Rico, Polanco-Abreu attended elementary and high schools in Isabela, Puerto Rico.
He graduated from the University of Puerto Rico, B.A., 1941, and LL.B., 1943.
He joined Phi Sigma Alpha fraternity.
He was admitted to the bar in 1943 and practiced law in Isabela and San Juan.
Legal adviser to the Tax Court of Puerto Rico from 1943 to 1944.
He served as member of the American Bar Association and Puerto Rico Bar Association.
He was one of the founders of the Institute for Democratic Studies in San José, Costa Rica.
He served in the House of Representatives, Commonwealth of Puerto Rico from 1949 to 1964.
He served as member of the Constitutional Convention of Puerto Rico in 1951-1952.
He was appointed speaker of the house from 1963 to 1964.

Polanco-Abreu was elected as a Popular Democrat to be Resident Commissioner of Puerto Rico to the United States Congress, November 3, 1964, for the term ending January 3, 1969.
He was an unsuccessful candidate for reelection in 1968.
He resumed the practice of law.
He was a resident of San Juan, Puerto Rico, until his death there on January 18, 1988.
He was interred at the Isabela Municipal Cemetery in Isabela, Puerto Rico.

See also

List of Hispanic Americans in the United States Congress

Notes

References

External links
 

|-

1920 births
1988 deaths
20th-century American politicians
Democratic Party members of the United States House of Representatives from Puerto Rico
People from Bayamón, Puerto Rico
20th-century Puerto Rican lawyers
Resident Commissioners of Puerto Rico
Speakers of the House of Representatives of Puerto Rico
University of Puerto Rico alumni